Webb Wallace Estes (August 12, 1897 – June 29, 1971) was an American farmer and businessman who founded Estes Express Lines, the largest privately held less-than-truckload (LTL) company in the United States.

Childhood and education 
Estes was born in Burke County, North Carolina, the son of David Wallace Estes and Myrta Wilton Webb. He attended primary school and was an apprentice to his father, who was a timber farmer and sawmill operator.

Career

Early years and life 
In 1920, Estes moved to a 100-acre farm that his father had purchased near Chase City, Virginia. Estes began farming cotton, raising livestock, and producing eggs and butter.

Estes Express Lines 

In 1931 during the height of the Great Depression, Estes purchased a used Chevrolet truck and began providing affordable livestock transportation services for local farmers near Chase City, Virginia. By the following year, he was able to hire his first driver, and had expanded services to include trucking and hauling general freight. The company continued to grow through the establishment of additional terminals, purchase of new routes, and acquisition of subsidiary trucking companies. The company was formally named "Estes Express Lines" in 1937. In his management style of the company, Estes was fiscally conservative and promoted slow and measured growth. During World War II, Estes was able to expand the business through contracts with the U.S. military to transport and deliver military supplies.

By the 1950s, the company had over 50 employees with annual revenues of US$695,000, reaching annual revenues of US$1 million by 1957. Estes led the company as president from its founding in 1931 until his death in 1971, when his son Robey assumed the role.

Other activities 
Estes was an elected member of the Mecklenburg County Board of supervisors, serving for 16 years. He also served as a board member of the First Commonwealth Corporation and the Community Memorial Hospital.

Personal life

Marriages and children 
In December 1919, Estes married Ruth Gladys Berry. They had four daughters and two sons, including:

 Robey Webb Estes (1921–2006)
 Charles Edwin Estes (1923–2015)
 Margaret Estes Hupp (1926–2007)
 Helen Estes Garland (1929–2003)
 Mary Estes Speight (1932–2017)
 Ruth Estes Tanner (1934–2020)

Death 
Estes died of complications from diabetes on June 29, 1971, in Richmond, Virginia. He was buried in Woodland Cemetery. At the time of his death, the company had over 650 employees and grossed $10 million annually.

Legacy 

Estes Express Lines remains in the ownership of the descendants of Estes. In 2015, the family was listed as No. 149 in America's Richest Families, with a family net worth US$1.7 billion.

Estes Road and the Estes Community Center in Chase City are both named for Estes.

See also 

 Estes Express Lines

References 

1897 births
1971 deaths
20th-century American businesspeople
20th-century American farmers
American trucking industry businesspeople
American transportation businesspeople
Baptists from Virginia
Businesspeople from North Carolina
Businesspeople from Richmond, Virginia
People from Mecklenburg County, Virginia